Verónica Forqué Vázquez-Vigo (1 December 1955 – 13 December 2021) was a Spanish stage, film and television actress. She was a four-time Goya Award winner, the most award-winning actress alongside Carmen Maura. She had a knack for characters "between ridiculous and tender, stunned and vehement".

Biography

Background 
Forqué was born in Madrid on 1 December 1955, to a family with an artistic background: her mother was the writer María del  and her father was filmmaker José María Forqué. Her grandfather, was a musician and composer. She had an older brother, film director Álvaro Forqué.

She began to study for a degree in psychology, but at the age of 17, switched to drama.

Beginnings

Onstage, she debuted in 1975, at age 19, with Núria Espert in the play Divinas palabras. Other early dramatic roles on stage include those of "Laura" in El zoo de cristal and "María" in María la mosca.

Stanley Kubrick selected Forqué for the European Spanish-language dub of Shelley Duvall (playing the role of "Wendy Torrance") in The Shining (1980).

She married director  in 1981; they had a daughter, María.

In 1982, she featured in the television series Ramón y Cajal directed by her father; she played the wife of Santiago Ramón y Cajal, Silveria Fañanás García.

Breakout
Her career took a leap forward with her breakout performance as Cristal, “a toothy heart-of-gold hooker” in Pedro Almodóvar's 1984 film, What Have I Done to Deserve This? She landed her first major television role in the 1985 sitcom Platos rotos, earning a Fotogramas de Plata in 1986 for her performance as Loli. She won her first Goya Award with a supporting role in Fernando Trueba's 1986 film Year of Enlightment.

In 1988, she won the Goya Awards for both Best Actress and Best Supporting Actress, for her roles in La vida alegre and Moors and Christians, respectively. She and Emma Suárez are the only two to have won two Goyas in the same year. Of Forqué's performance as a doctor treating sexually transmitted diseases in La vida alegre, Paula Corroto wrote in El Confidencial, Forqué’s "smile (and laughter) were forever in the hearts of everyone who saw this film. A comedian from head to toe.”

Forqué played the lead in Almodóvar's Kika (1993). A review by Stanley Kauffmann in The New Republic said her part in the film was "a better role than her American debut in Jimmy Hollywood, but it doesn't make the most of this spirited comedienne." Janet Maslin, writing in The New York Times, found Forqué’s performance “spirited and appealing, never in danger of being overpowered by [her] surroundings."

She starred in television series such as Pepa y Pepe (1995) and La vida de Rita (2003). The former series, loosely inspired by Roseanne and earning audience ratings breaking seven million viewers mark and 40% share, earned Forqué a great deal of popularity in Spain.

Late career

Forqué fell into a depression in the wake of her 2014 separation from Iborra, a situation aggravated by the death of her brother Álvaro some months later.

In 2017, she won the Nacho Martínez award from the Gijón International Film Festival.

At the 5th Feroz Awards (2018), Forqué received the Honorary Award, which recognised her long career.

One of Forqué's last starring roles was in the Ángeles Reiné's LGBTQ romantic comedy film So My Grandma's a Lesbian, playing Sofía, the lesbian partner of the character Rosa María Sardá played in her final role; the film was released in 2020 after Sardá's death.

A participant in the sixth season of the competitive reality television cooking show MasterChef Celebrity, she quit the show during the November 2021 semifinal, citing exhaustion.

Death
Forqué was found dead in her Madrid residence on 13 December 2021 at the age of 66, presumably a suicide. She left two posthumous performances in feature films: 1000 Miles from Christmas (to be released on 24 December 2021) and Espejo, espejo (tentative 2022 release). She was also providing the voice for Rose in the upcoming animation series Pobre diablo, yet some scenes were still pending for recording; Buendía Estudios declined immediate comment on the show's future.

Filmography

Film

Television

Accolades

References

External links

 
 

1955 births
2021 deaths
2021 suicides
20th-century Spanish actresses
21st-century Spanish actresses
Actresses from Madrid
Spanish Buddhists
Best Supporting Actress Goya Award winners
Spanish film actresses
Spanish people of Argentine descent
Spanish stage actresses
Spanish television actresses